Andrew Hugill (born 1957) is a British composer, writer and academic. He is both a professor of music and a professor of creative computing. He directs the Creative Computing programme at University of Leicester.

Biography

Andrew Hugill studied composition with Roger Marsh at the University of Keele between 1976 and 1980, and in 1983 he founded the ensemble "George W. Welch".  He began lecturing at Leicester Polytechnic in 1986, working alongside Gavin Bryars and Dave Smith, eventually becoming subject-leader for the BA Performing Arts: Music. He taught composition, performance and music history.

He founded the Music, Technology and Innovation programme in 1997 at De Montfort University and taught Creative and Negotiated Projects, Musicianship and Internet Music.

In 2006 he founded the Institute of Creative Technologies and was its director until 2012.

In 2013, he set up Creative Computing at Bath Spa University.

In 2018, he founded the Creative Computing programme at University of Leicester.

Hugill is a Principal Fellow and a National Teaching Fellow of the Higher Education Academy. In 2006 he was Highly Commended for the Most Imaginative Use of Distance Learning by the Times Higher Education Awards.

Compositions

Hugill's compositions include music for solo instruments and ensembles, orchestral music, and electronic and digital music.

In 2004, Hugill was nominated for the BT Digital Music Awards for his Internet project with the Philharmonia Orchestra – The Sound Exchange.

Some of his well-known works are: Pianolith (2003); the internet music project Symphony for Cornwall (1999); the electroacoustic composition Island Symphony (1995), an electroacoustic and subsequently orchestral work, inspired by St. George's Island; Brisset Rhymes (1990) and Catalogue de Grenouilles (1988) for massed frog recordings and human musicians.

Nocturne, for two pianos and percussion, was commissioned by BBC Radio 3 in 1997. His Sonneries Parfumées for piano solo won a prize in the Piano 2000 competition in Tokyo. Simon and Ennoia (1987), for small ensemble, was broadcast by the BBC in 1990.

Research and publications

Hugill's research is transdisciplinary and covers literature, music and computer science. He has published articles on aspects of surrealism in literature, digital music, and software engineering.

In 2008, Hugill published the book The Digital Musician in which he identifies the possibilities and challenges new technologies offer the modern musician. A second, updated edition was published as an e-book in 2012. A third edition was published in 2018.

In 2012, he published 'Pataphysics: A Useless Guide, the first complete history of the subject in English.

Pataphysics
Hugill is an active researcher in 'pataphysics and a member of the Collège de 'Pataphysique, where he was awarded the Ordre de la Grande Guidouille and the rank of Commandeur Requis. He is the curator of the CD Pataphysics, a history of 'Pataphysics in sound.

References

External links
Personal Website
Music Technology and Innovation Centre, De Montfort University
New Impressions of Africa
Institute of Creative Technologies, De Montfort University
College de Pataphysique

1957 births
Living people
British composers
Academics of De Montfort University